The Boardroom is a 1988 Australian television film directed by Brian Phillis and starring Vincent Ball and Tony Wager.

References

External links
The Boardroom at IMDb

Australian television films
1980s English-language films
1988 films
1988 television films
1980s Australian films